Chorzęcin  is a village in the administrative district of Gmina Tomaszów Mazowiecki, within Tomaszów Mazowiecki County, Łódź Voivodeship, in central Poland.

In 2019, the Volunteer Fire Brigade in Chorzęcin celebrated 100th anniversary.

There is a public transport bus from Tomaszów Mazowiecki to Chorzęcin (2 lines).

Gallery

References

Villages in Tomaszów Mazowiecki County